Elone Lutui (born 2 January 1961) is a Tongan boxer. He competed in the men's light middleweight event at the 1984 Summer Olympics.

References

External links
 

1961 births
Living people
Tongan male boxers
Olympic boxers of Tonga
Boxers at the 1984 Summer Olympics
Place of birth missing (living people)
Light-middleweight boxers